Gregg Alan Rolie (born June 17, 1947) is an American keyboardist, singer and songwriter. Rolie served as lead singer of the bands Santana and Journey – both of which he co-founded. He also helmed rock group The Storm, performed in Ringo Starr & His All-Starr Band, and currently performs with his Gregg Rolie Band. Rolie is a two-time inductee of the Rock and Roll Hall of Fame, having been inducted both as a member of Santana in 1998 and as a member of Journey in 2017.

Career
Rolie was born in Seattle, Washington, United States. Prior to Santana, he played with a group called William Penn and His Pals while attending Cubberley High School in Palo Alto, California, circa 1965.

A year after graduating from high school in 1965, Rolie joined Carlos Santana and others to form the Santana Blues Band, which was later shortened simply to Santana. As a co-founding member of Santana, Rolie was part of the band's first wave of success, including an appearance at the Woodstock Music and Art Festival in 1969 and central roles in several hit albums. He was their original lead vocalist, with his voice appearing on well-known Santana songs such as "Black Magic Woman" (US #4), "Oye Como Va", "No One To Depend On" and "Evil Ways". He also became well known for his skill on the Hammond B3 organ, with solos on many of the aforementioned hits. He has song-writing credits on many tracks from this period. However, persistent differences with Carlos Santana regarding the musical direction of the band led Rolie to leave in 1972.

In 1973 Rolie joined a new band with ex-Santana guitarist Neal Schon. This became Journey. Starring in a lineup that featured Schon, Aynsley Dunbar, George Tickner, and Ross Valory, he was keyboardist for the band's first six albums. On Journey and Look into the Future, he was lead vocalist, and on Next he shared those duties with guitarist Neal Schon. After Steve Perry joined the band in 1977, Rolie sang co-lead vocals on several songs on the albums Infinity, Evolution, and Departure.

After leaving Journey in 1980, Rolie released several solo albums, including the eponymous Gregg Rolie in 1985. This album featured the song "I Wanna Go Back", which later became a hit for Eddie Money, and included contributions from Carlos Santana, Peter Wolf, Neal Schon, and Craig Chaquico. A second solo effort, Gringo, was released in 1987.

Rolie formed The Storm in 1991 with Steve Smith and Ross Valory of Journey. Similar to his work with Journey and Steve Perry, Rolie played keyboards and was a co-lead vocalist on several tracks of the band's first, eponymous, album, which spent 17 weeks on the Billboard albums chart peaking at #133 and spawned the hit singles "I've Got a Lot to Learn About Love," and "Show Me the Way." Despite this success, Interscope Records shelved the band's second album, which was recorded in 1993. It was finally released in 1996 on another label. In 1998, Rolie and other former members of Santana, including Neal Schon, briefly reunited as Abraxas Pool, releasing one album.

When Schon left to lead a re-formed Journey later that year, Rolie and Ron Wikso began work in 1999, on a Gregg Rolie solo CD, titled Roots, which eventually led to the forming of the Gregg Rolie Band. Besides Rolie and Wikso, Roots featured appearances by Neal Schon, Alphonso Johnson, Dave Amato, Adrian Areas, Michael Carabello. The Gregg Rolie Band saw Kurt Griffey taking over guitar duties and the addition of Wally Minko as a second keyboardist. They recorded a live CD at Sturgis called Rain Dance, which was released in 2009.

In 2010, Rolie released Five Days and subsequently formed a duo with Alan Haynes, which eventually led to the formation of the Gregg Rolie Quartet, with the addition of long time collaborator/drummer, Ron Wikso and bassist Evan "Sticky" Lopez.

From 2012 to 2021 he toured as a member of Ringo Starr and his All Starr Band performing Santana hits "Black Magic Woman", "Evil Ways" and "Everybody's Everything". The band also included Toto guitarist Steve Lukather, Todd Rundgren, Richard Page, Mark Rivera and Gregg Bissonette.

On February 2, 2013 Carlos Santana confirmed that he would reunite his classic lineup, most of whom played Woodstock with him in 1969. Santana said of Rolie, "I'm pretty sure Gregg's going to do it." Speaking in 2012 of such a reunion, Rolie told Radio.com "it's just a matter of putting it together and going and doing it. I would do it. I think it's a great idea. People would love it. It could be great!" In 2016, as part of Santana's original line-up they released their fourth album, titled Santana IV.

On February 9, 2018, Rolie reunited with Schon for a charity show at San Francisco's The Independent, benefiting North Bay Fire Relief. The group also featured former Journey drummer Deen Castronovo (who also sang some of the vocals) and bassist Marco Mendoza of The Dead Daisies. In 2019 Rolie reunited with Schon, Castronovo and Mendoza for four more concert dates.

Philanthropy
Rolie is a proponent of music education for children. In 2005, he signed on as an official supporter of Little Kids Rock, a nonprofit organization that provides free musical instruments and instruction to children in underserved public schools throughout the US. He sits on the organization's Honorary board of directors.

Personal life
Rolie and his wife, Lori, reside near Austin, Texas.

Discography

Solo discography
(Also as Gregg Rolie Band)
 Gregg Rolie – 1985
 Gringo – 1987
 Rough Tracks – 1997
 Roots – 2001
 Rain Dance (Live) – 2007
 Five Days EP – 2011
 Sonic Ranch - 2019

with Santana
 Santana – 1969
 Abraxas – 1970
 Santana III – 1971
 Caravanserai – 1972
 Shangó – 1982
 Freedom – 1987
 Santana IV - 2016

with Journey
 Journey – 1975
 Look into the Future – 1976
 Next – 1977
 Infinity – 1978
 Evolution – 1979
 Departure – 1980
 Dream, After Dream – 1980
 Captured – 1981

with The Storm
The Storm – 1991
 Eye of The Storm – 1995

with Abraxas Pool
 Abraxas Pool – 1997

Collaboration 
 Postcards from Paradise from Ringo Starr (2015) - Organ on "Island in the Sun", a song on which he participated on composing.

References

Bibliography

External links
 Gregg Rolie's official site
 Gregg Rolie Interview at The Journey Zone
 Gregg Rolie biography 
 
 
 

1947 births
Living people
20th-century American musicians
American rock keyboardists
American organists
American male organists
American male singers
American rock singers
Musicians from Seattle
Singers from Washington (state)
American people of Norwegian descent
Journey (band) members
Santana (band) members
21st-century American keyboardists
21st-century American musicians
21st-century organists
The Storm (American band) members
20th-century American keyboardists
Ringo Starr & His All-Starr Band members